The United States competed at the 2011 Summer Universiade in Shenzhen, China.

Medalists

Archery

The United States was represented by men's and women's athletes in the archery competition.

Men
Compound

Women
Compound

Basketball

The United States has qualified both a men's and a women's team. The official rosters were announced on August 8.

Men
The men's team participated in Group D, showing much promise after running through the round-robin with an undefeated record. However, they dropped a close game to Lithuania in the quarterfinals, sending them to the 5th-8th classification bracket. They defeated Germany to secure 5th place.

Team roster
The men's team roster is as follows:

|}
| valign="top" |
 Head coach
  (Purdue University)
 Assistant coach(es)
  (University of Tennessee)
  (Butler University)
 Team Physician
  (University of Oklahoma)
 Athletic Trainer
  (Southern Illinois University)

Legend
 (C) Team captain
 nat field describes country of university
 Age field is age on August 13, 2011
|}

Preliminary round

Quarterfinals

Classification 5th-8th place

5th place match

Women
The women's team participated in Group B and won with 40+ point leads in the round robin. They finished in first place after defeating Chinese Taipei in the final, winning the gold medal.

Team roster
The women's team roster is as follows:

|}
| valign="top" |
 Head coach
  (Iowa State University)
 Assistant coach(es)
  (Duquesne University)
  (Georgetown University)
 Team Physician
  (University of Oklahoma)
 Athletic Trainer
  (University of Georgia)

Legend
 (C) Team captain
 nat field describes country of university
 Age field is age on August 13, 2011
|}

Preliminary round

Quarterfinals

Semi-finals

Gold medal match

Beach volleyball

The United States will be represented by two men's teams and one women's team.

Men

Consolation Round

Women

Consolation Round

Swimming

The United States sent a men's and women's swimming team of 48 swimmers.

Men

 Tullius was tied for the eighth spot in the final. He lost a swim-off against Jan Philip Glania of Germany, reaching a time of 26.02, 0.22 seconds short of Glania's time.
Coaching staff
Head coach: Rich DeSelm 
Assistant coaches: Brette Hawke, Harvey Humphries, Anthony Nesty

Women

 Connolly set a Universiade record in the heats, but broke her own record in the final a few hours later.
Coaching staff
Head coach: Eric Hansen 
Assistant coaches: Carol Capitani, Rick DeMont, John Hargis

Table tennis

The United States will be represented by a men's and women's team.

Men
Singles

Doubles

Team

Women
Singles

Doubles

Team

Tennis

The United States will be represented by five tennis players, three male and two female.

Men

Consolation Draw

Women

Consolation Draw

Mixed

Volleyball

The United States qualified a men's team.

Men
The men's team competed in Group D. They finished in third place after a close loss to the Czech Republic and a loss to Thailand put them right outside of qualifying to the playoffs. After a close loss to Japan, the United States lost the chance to compete for ninth place and settled for thirteenth place.

Team
The men's indoor volleyball team is as follows:

 Outside hitters
 Thomas Amberg
 Tri Bourne
 Brad Lawson
 Jeff Menzel
 Cory Yoder
 Taylor Hughes (alternate)
 Opposite hitters
 Carson Clark
 Murphy Troy
 Jim Baughman (alternate)
 Kyle Caldwell (alternate)
 Rob Stowell (alternate)

 Middle blockers
 Weston Dunlap
 Ryan Meehan
 Matt Pollock (alternate)
 Matt Rawson (alternate)
 Setters
 Kawika Shoji
 Riley McKibbin
 Libero
 Erik Shoji

Coaches
 Gordon Mayforth – Head Coach
 Pete Hanson – Assistant Coach/Team Leader
 JT Wenger – Assistant Coach
 Larnie Boquiren – Trainer

Preliminary round results

|}

Classification 9th-16th

Classification 13th-16th

13th place match

Water polo 

The United States qualified both a men's and a women's team.

Men
The men's team participated in Group C. The United States qualified for the quarterfinals with only one loss to Serbia, the eventual gold medallists, in pool play. The men's team was well on its way to the final, but was edged by Russia in the semifinal and was relegated to the bronze medal match, where Macedonia defeated the United States. The men's team finished fourth overall.

Preliminary round

Eighthfinals

Quarterfinals

Semifinals

Bronze medal match

Women

The women's team participated in Group B. The team went through the preliminary round undefeated, and fought their way to the final with close wins in the quarterfinals and semifinals. In the final, the United States was stunned by China in a ten-point loss, and earned a silver medal.

Preliminary round

Quarterfinals

Semifinals

Gold medal match

References

2011 in American sports
Nations at the 2011 Summer Universiade
2011